Brave Enough: Live at the Variety Playhouse is singer-songwriter Sara Bareilles' second official concert recording released on CD and DVD. The recording was made at the Variety Playhouse in Atlanta, Georgia on May 20, 2013, at one of the stops of Bareilles' Brave Enough tour. On this tour, Bareilles performed solo, facing "what had up until that point been a pretty large fear", but ending up feeling that it was "one of [her] favorite experiences of [her] whole life".

Singles
"Goodbye Yellow Brick Road" was sent to Hot/Modern/AC radio in the United States on December 2, 2013.

Track listing 
 "Love On The Rocks / Bennie and the Jets"
 "Uncharted"
 "Love Song"
 "(Sittin' On) The Dock of the Bay"
 "Manhattan" 
 "Let The Rain" 
 "I Just Want You" 
 "Come Round Soon" 
 "Once Upon Another Time" 
 "Brave"
 "King of Anything"
 "Gravity"
 "Goodbye Yellow Brick Road"

Personnel 
 Sara Bareilles: Vocals, piano, guitar, harmonium

References 

Sara Bareilles live albums
2013 live albums
2013 video albums
Live video albums
Sara Bareilles video albums
Epic Records live albums
Epic Records video albums